Bloober Team S.A. is a Polish video game developer based in Kraków. Founded in November 2008 by Peter Babieno and Peter Bielatowicz, the company is best known for developing Layers of Fear (2016), Observer (2017), Blair Witch (2019), and The Medium (2021). In January 2018, Bloober Team received the Paszport Polityki award in the "Digital Culture" category.

History 
Bloober Team was founded by Peter Babieno and Peter Bielatowicz. The studio was originally part of Nibris, a developer set up in 2006, but sought to become independent through investor funding. The studio formally launched on 6 November 2008, employing 20 people in Kraków offices. Babieno became the chief executive officer for the company. In October 2010, following Nibris' decision to exit the game development business and the cancellation of their only video game, Sadness, many of the company's developers joined Bloober Team.

One of their first titles they developed was Music Master: Chopin for Microsoft Windows and iOS. Because it was released to celebrate the 200th anniversary of the birth of Frédéric Chopin, the game contains several piano and vocal performances of Chopin's work. In 2013, they released a free-to-play multiplayer online battle arena game Deathmatch Village for the PlayStation 3 and PlayStation Vita. It features cross-play interactivity between the two consoles and consists of three-on-three arena battles.

One of the turning points in Bloober Team's history was the development of Basement Crawl, which debuted alongside the PlayStation 4. Following poor reception, the studio reworked the game by re-using the core game concept while introducing new graphics, game mechanics, story, and game modes. The resulting product, Brawl, was released in February 2015 to favourable reviews and was made available free of charge for owners of Basement Crawl.

The developer received the Paszport Polityki award in the "Digital Culture" category on 10 January 2018. A new project, codenamed Project Méliès, was announced on 8 March 2018. In October that year, the title was announced to be Layers of Fear 2, to be released in 2019 by Gun Media.

In 2009, Bloober Team founded a subsidiary limited liability company iFun4all sp. z o.o. and later brought it to NewConnect stock exchange with the initial public offering occurring on 23 September 2016. On 23 August 2019 company changed its name from iFun4all to Draw Distance. Bloober Team remains the owner of 34.98% of the Draw Distance shares.

After about a year of negotiations with various companies related to the acquisition, Bloober Team stated in March 2021 that they plan to remain as an independent company, though will look to do strategic partnering with one of these companies in the future.

Bloober Team and Konami announced a strategic partnership in June 2021 to jointly share technology and game development towards video game titles.

In October 2021, Bloober Team announced that Tencent became their majority shareholder with 22% of shares. In May 2022, Bloober Team announced a "significant license and distribution agreement" with Sony Interactive Entertainment.

During Summer Games Fest 2022, Bloober Team confirmed they were working on a new Layers of Fear, described as both a remaster and sequel of the original series, built using Unreal Engine 5.

In October 2022, after months of rumors, Konami announced that Bloober Team is remaking Silent Hill 2. The studio is using Unreal Engine 5 and it will be a timed console-exclusive on PlayStation 5 while also releasing on Windows through Steam. In an interview with DreadXP, Bloober Team revealed that they were invited by Konami to pitch their idea for a Silent Hill 2 remake among other studios.

Games developed

Cancelled games 
 Gender Wars: The Battle for iOS
 Future Fight, previously titled Gender Wars: The Battle, for iOS
 Last Flight for Wii

References

External links 
 

Companies based in Kraków
Companies listed on the Warsaw Stock Exchange
Polish companies established in 2008
Video game companies established in 2008
Video game companies of Poland
Video game development companies